ZZ dibosons are rare pairs of Z bosons. They were first observed by the experiments at the Large Electron–Positron Collider (ALEPH, DELPHI, L3 and OPAL). The first observation in a hadron collider was made by the scientists of DØ collaboration at Fermilab.

Discussion

ZZ dibosons  are force-carrying particles observed as products of proton–antiproton collisions at the Tevatron, the world's second highest-energy particle accelerator (after the CERN Large Hadron Collider). The first observation of the ZZ dibosons was announced at a Fermilab seminar on 30 July 2008.

The rarest diboson processes after ZZ dibosons are those involving the Higgs boson, so seeing ZZ diboson is an essential step in demonstrating the ability to see the Higgs boson. ZZ dibosons are the latest in a series of observations of pairs of gauge bosons (force-carrying particles) by DØ and its sister experiment CDF (also at Tevatron).

Final analysis of the data for this discovery was done by a team of international researchers including scientists of American, Belgian, British, Georgian, Italian, and Russian nationalities. The observations began with the study of the already-rare production of W bosons plus photons; then Z bosons plus photons; then observation of W pairs; then a mix of W and Z boson. The ZZ is the combination which has the lowest predicted likelihood of production in the Standard Model due to the smaller couplings.

See also
Dineutron
Diproton
Pauli exclusion principle
Higgs boson
List of particles

References

External links
 
 
 
 
 

Bosons
Electroweak theory